Casa Vianello is an Italian situation comedy produced by Mediaset that aired on Canale 5 (1988–2005) and Rete 4 (2005–2007).

Characters 
 Raimondo Vianello: played by himself
 Sandra Mondaini: played by herself
 Tata: played by Giorgia Trasselli

Italian comedy television series
1988 Italian television series debuts
2007 Italian television series endings
1980s Italian television series
1990s Italian television series
2000s Italian television series
Canale 5 original programming
Rete 4 original programming